The New Media Award may refer to:

A category of the International Media Awards, London, UK
A category of the Freedom of Expression Awards by the Index on Censorship organization, London, UK
 An award by the New Statesman magazine, London, UK
A category of the National Cartoonists Society Division Awards, US
 A category of the Korea Drama Awards
 An award by The Economist magazine
 An award by  Veterans of Foreign Wars, US
 BAFTA "New Media Award"
 Cinekid New Media Award